Józef Lustgarten (1 November 1889, Krakow - 22 September 1973, Kraków) was a Polish Jewish footballer.

Born in Cracow, he was Jewish.  He represented Cracovia. He also represented Poland in international matches. He was the first manager of the Poland national football team in 1922.

During World War II, he was arrested in Lwów in 1939 by the Soviet NKVD, and sent to the Gulag, where spent 17 years in forced labor camps. After returning to Poland, he became the honorary president of "Cracovia Kraków" club.

See also
List of select Jewish football (association; soccer) players

References

1889 births
1973 deaths
Polish footballers
Jewish footballers
MKS Cracovia (football) players
Footballers from Kraków
Polish people detained by the NKVD
Foreign Gulag detainees
Polish deportees to Soviet Union
Association football forwards
Polish football managers
Poland national football team managers
Jews from Galicia (Eastern Europe)
People from the Kingdom of Galicia and Lodomeria
Jewish Polish sportspeople
Austro-Hungarian Jews